Borkenan, also rendered as Burkenan, may refer to:
 Borkenan-e Olya
 Borkenan-e Sofla